Luscombe is a rural locality in the City of Gold Coast, Queensland, Australia.

Geography
The eastern boundary of Luscombe follows the Albert River.  Several large quarries are located in the north and east of the locality.

Road infrastructure
The Beaudesert–Beenleigh Road runs through the south-west corner.

History
The Darlington Park Raceway was a  go-kart racing track. It was used for an assignment on the third season of The Mole. The raceway was shut down on 3 February 2007 after residents complained to the council about excessive noise. The raceway was located on the western side of Peachey Road near Stanmore Road, now replaced by the Darlington Park Industrial Estate.

In the 2011 census, Luscombe had a population of 448 people.

Education
There are no schools in Luscombe. The nearest primary schools are Cedar Creek State School in neighbouring Cedar Creek to the south, Windaroo State School in Mount Warren Park to the north, Ormeau State School in Pimpama to the east, and Norfolk Village State School in Ormeau to the north-east. The nearest secondary schools are Windaroo Valley State High School in Bahrs Scrub to the north and Ormeau Woods State High School in Ormeau to the east.

Amenities
There are a number of parks in the area:

 Halls Road East Parklands
 Halls Road Reserve

 Halls Road South Reserve

 Luscombe Reserve East

References

External links

  — includes Luscombe

Suburbs of the Gold Coast, Queensland
Localities in Queensland